The Preseli transmitting station (formerly spelt Presely) is a broadcasting and telecommunications facility on the eastern end of the Preseli Mountains, close to the villages of Crymych and Pentre Galar in Pembrokeshire, Wales. It is owned and operated by Arqiva.

The triangle of antenna arrays aimed beams of signal towards Pembrokeshire, another lobe was directed towards western Carmarthenshire and a northward beam covered south western Cardiganshire. The northward beam from the site also fed the transmitter at Arfon in North Wales.

The Welsh region ITV programming was initially provided by Teledu Cymru which was taken over by TWW in 1964, and eventually HTV Wales who took over from 1968.

In 1971, three protesters from Cymdeithas yr Iaith Gymraeg were jailed for "conspiring to trespass" after gaining access to the site compound and climbing the lower section of the mast. This was part of a series of protests in Wales aiming to get a dedicated Welsh-language TV channel established. The campaign was eventually considered to have been mostly successful with the establishment of S4C (Sianel 4 Cymru) eleven years later.

The site was uprated in 1973 to transmit UHF 625-line PAL analogue television channels, starting with BBC1, BBC2 and HTV Wales, with S4C being added in late 1982. The VHF channel 8 transmissions were discontinued in January 1985 as 405-line TV in the UK was phased out. Channel 5 started analogue TV transmissions in 1997. Six digital TV multiplexes were added in 1998 and the site kept this configuration until 2009, when all analogue television signals were permanently switched off.

The mast also carries Classic FM on 100.5 MHz and Heart South Wales on 105.7 MHz, and transmits national digital radio multiplexes for the BBC and Digital One multiplexes. In 2017, Nation Radio started broadcasting on 107.10 MHz.

The transmitter signals were also received across the Irish sea in many parts of the east and south east coast of the Republic of Ireland, mainly in counties Dublin and Wicklow. From 1962 onward, many households in these counties would point their outdoor aerials towards the Irish sea and could receive transmission from this transmitter.  When cable television launched in the early 1970s, the Welsh BBC and ITV stations were provided on the cable platform as these channels were mainly received in the Dublin and Wicklow counties.

Transmissions

Analogue television

14 September 1962 - 16 August 1973

16 August 1973 – 1 November 1982
Colour TV eventually came to West Wales. This was fairly late by UK standards, but even the area's M.P. couldn't get it started any quicker.

1 November 1982 – 3 January 1985
The launch of Channel 4 (S4C in Wales) took the UHF capabilities of the site to its design maximum. Being in Wales, this transmitter radiated the S4C variant.

3 January 1985 – 30 March 1997
The VHF television transmitter was shut down after 22 years and 3 months of service.

30 March 1997 – 15 November 1998
Channel 5 started broadcasting on UHF channel 37. A fifth analogue TV channel was outside the design specifications of the British UHF transmitter plan and this forced the use of out-of-band channel 37 which was supposed to be kept clear of transmissions.

Analogue and digital television

15 November 1998 – 19 August 2009

This was the initial roll-out for digital television using the DVB-T system. The transmitter frequencies and power outputs were chosen not to interfere with the UHF TV channels, but to be received with the same aerial-group. The QAM constellations and number of carriers were changed around 2002 after the collapse of ITV Digital as the service was taken over by the Freeview consortium.

19 August 2009 – 16 September 2009
BBC2 Wales on channel 40 closed after 36 years of service, and HTV Wales was moved from channel 43 to the vacated channel 40 for what would be its final month of service.

Multiplex 1 on channel 47+ was renamed BBC A and moved to channel 43+ (which had just been vacated by analogue HTV Wales). In addition to the power increase to 20 kW ERP, it was reconfigured to 64QAM and 8k carriers, which resulted in a service area similar to the old analogue transmissions but with much more bandwidth available than Multiplex 1 ever had.

For the duration of the switchover, all the channels carried on Multiplex B were duplicated on this new PSB1 multiplex.

Digital television

16 September 2009 – 31 October 2012
All remaining analogue television was shut down after 36 years of service. The pre-switchover low-power digital transmissions (apart from Arq A and SDN) were upgraded to full power and configured to 64QAM and 8k carriers, with some frequency changes and with new names for the multiplexes:

31 October 2012 - present
As a side-effect of frequency-changes elsewhere in the region to do with clearance of the 800 MHz band for 4G mobile phone use, Preseli's "Arqiva B" multiplex was moved from channel 49- to channel 39+ and the "BBC B" multiplex was moved from channel 50+ to channel 40+.

Analogue radio (FM VHF)

September 1992 - September 2003
First FM transmissions from Preseli.

September 2003 - present

In 2017, Nation Radio on 107.10 MHz started broadcasting on the Preseli at 2.5KW, with a directional antenna towards Pembrokeshire. This signal penetrates all of Pembrokeshire and most of Carmarthenshire.

Digital radio (DAB)

20 April 2006 - present

See also
List of masts
List of tallest buildings and structures in Great Britain
List of radio stations in the United Kingdom

References

External links
MB21's page on 405 TV to Wales and the West
"405 Alive's list of transmitters"
More details on 405-line ITV transmitters
The Transmission Gallery: Photographs and Information
The Transmission Gallery: Television Coverage Map
Presely Transmitter at thebigtower.com

Buildings and structures in Pembrokeshire
Transmitter sites in Wales